Thushaaram is a 1981 Indian Malayalam-language action film directed by I. V. Sasi, starring Ratheesh, Seema, Rani Padmini and Jose. Lyrics were written by Yusafali and the music score by Shyam. The film, originally was planned with actor Jayan, but his untimely death forced the makers to cast Ratheesh, a struggling actor as the lead.

Plot
Raveedran is an officer of the Indian army. Raveedran and his wife stay in army quarters in Kashmir, he is working under Malayali brigadier. One day Raveedran's wife commits suicide. He does not understand why. After some days he realizes that it was murder.
The Brigadier had killed his wife. Then Raveendran kidnaps the brigadier's daughter for revenge. When the Brigadier's daughter understands Raveedran's story, she loves him.

In the climax the brigadier is punished by army court and loses his uniform.

Cast

Ratheesh as Cap. P. Raveendran
Seema as Dr. Sindhu Menon
Rani Padmini as Shobha Raveendran
Jose as Cap. Vijayan Menon
Balan K. Nair as Brig. Rajashekhara Menon
Kundara Johny as Cap. Nair
Kunchan as Cap. Alexander
Lalu Alex as Cap. Alex
Nellikkode Bhaskaran as Govindan Nair
Jaffer Khan as Jaffer Khan

Remake

Thushaaram was shot in Kashmir. The film was remade in Bollywood as Insaaf Main Karoonga with Rajesh Khanna playing the lead role.

References

External links
 

1984 films
1980s Malayalam-language films
Films shot in Ladakh
Indian Army in films
Malayalam films remade in other languages
Films directed by I. V. Sasi